New York's 33rd congressional district was a congressional district for the United States House of Representatives in New York. It was eliminated as a result of the 1990 Census. It was last represented by Henry J. Nowak. Much of this area became part of 30th District during the 1990s, and is now largely in the 27th district.

Components
1983–1993: 
Parts of Erie
1973–1983:
All of Cayuga, Schuyler, Seneca, Yates
Parts of Onondaga, Ontario, Oswego, Steuben, Tompkins
1971–1973:
All of Broome, Chemung, Tioga
Parts of Tompkins
1963–1971:
All of Broome, Chemung, Tioga, Tompkins
1953–1963:
All of Franklin, Lewis, Jefferson, Oswego, St. Lawrence
1945–1953:
All of Clinton, Essex, Saratoga, Warren, Washington
Parts of Rensselaer
1913–1945:
All of Herkimer, Oneida
1903–1913:
All of Seneca, Schuyler, Chemung and Steuben County, New York.

From 1893–1903 the 33rd district covered all of Erie County except the heavily settled southern portion of the city of Buffalo, New York.  Even though about two-thirds of Buffalo's area was in the 33rd District, the 32nd district which had the southern third or so of Buffalo and none of the rest of Erie county had about 6000 more people than the 33rd district.

From 1885–1893 all of Niagara County and all of Erie county except Buffalo had been in the 33rd district. During this time Buffalo was the 32nd district which had 37,000 more people than the 33rd district.

From its formation in 1875 until 1885 the 33rd district had covered Chautauqua and Cattaraugus Counties.

Past demographics
The population of the 33rd's 1903–1913 area was 180,810 in 1900. The population was 0.9% black at this point.

List of members representing the district

Election results
The following chart shows historic election results. Bold type indicates victor. Italic type indicates incumbent.

References

 Congressional Biographical Directory of the United States 1774–present
 Election Statistics 1920–present Clerk of the House of Representatives

33
Former congressional districts of the United States
Constituencies established in 1833
1833 establishments in New York (state)
Constituencies disestablished in 1863
1863 disestablishments in New York (state)
Constituencies established in 1875
1875 establishments in New York (state)
Constituencies disestablished in 1993
1993 disestablishments in New York (state)